Collins Creek, also known as Collins Fork, is a tributary of Goose Creek in Clay County in the U.S. state of Kentucky.

Tributaries and post offices 
The tributaries are:
Saplings Fork, previously known as Furnace Branch, whose mouth is  along Buzzard
 Engine Branch
 Whites Branch

On Buzzard Creek 
Willowdale postoffice was established on 1901-09-07 by postmaster Ella White.
She named it for the preponderance of willow trees in the area, which was likely at the mouth of Furnace Branch/Saplings Fork.

Lincoln postoffice was established on 1923-05-26 by postmaster Hughey L. Tanksley.
His original choice of name was Harding, which clashed with an already existing Hardin postoffice in Marshall County, his choices of names presumed to be politically inspired by Republican Presidents Abraham Lincoln and Warren G. Harding.

On Collins Creek itself 
Safe postoffice was established on 1904-06-18 by postmaster Emmet Lee Walker.
Located in a store just upstream of Engine Branch, it lasted until 1907-04-15.

Cottongim postoffice was established on 1918-07-03 by postmaster Sallie Cottongim Hacker.
She named it for the family of her parents, John Lucas Cottongim and Susan Smith Cottongim, and grandparent Pierce Cottongim (born 1792) who had come to Clay County from South Carolina.
Her first choice of name had been Jonsee, named after the Jonsee railway station that it served and was only a few hundred yards away from.
The railway station in turn was named after John C. White, "John C." to "Jonsee", landowner from whom the railway company had bought land rights in 1916.
The postoffice became a rural branch in 1963, and closed in 1969.

Bluehole 
Bluehole post office was established on 1916-08-04, originally to be named Gladys, the choice of name preferred by its first postmaster Charles S. Townsley.
However, that name clashed with a postoffice in Lawrence County and his next preference was Bluehole (after the common Kentucky geographic feature of a blue hole).

It was originally located  up Buzzard Creek, at approximately the site of the Lower Buzzard School, but only lasted at that location until its first closure in August 1917.
Its next postmaster, Ella Perkins, re-located it nearer to the new railway station of Rodonnel, placing it  up Collins Creek on 1918-05-01, and from then until its closure in 1985 it was located at several places along Collins Creek and Kentucky Route 11.

The name is still used informally for the area where the various postoffices were, rather than the name of the railway station.

See also
List of rivers of Kentucky

References

Sources

Further reading 

 
 

Rivers of Kentucky
Rivers of Clay County, Kentucky